Muhammad Rizki Mirzamah (born July 31, 1991) is an Indonesian footballer that currently plays for Barito Putera in the Indonesia Super League.

References

External links

1991 births
Association football forwards
Living people
Indonesian footballers
Liga 1 (Indonesia) players
Gresik United players
Indonesian Premier Division players